The Ice Skating Association of India (ISAI) is the national governing body for competitive ice skating disciplines, including figure skating, synchronized skating, speed skating, and short track speed skating in India. The ISAI is affiliated to the International Skating Union, and the Asian Skating Union.

History
The Ice Skating Association of India was  registered with the Registrar of Societies in March 2002 based on the advice of Randhir Singh, Secretary General of the Indian Olympic Association (IOA) and then IOA President Suresh Kalmadi. Prior to the establishment of the ISAI, the sport was governed by the Winter Games Federation of India as it was a winter sport. The IOA felt that the creation of a separate national federation would help encourage the growth of the sport in the country.

Rinks
The ISAI operates 4 indoor and 5 outdoor ice rinks in India.

Indoor

All weather
 iSkate, Ambience Mall, Gurgaon, Haryana

Minor
 Ice Rink, EsselWorld, Mumbai, Maharashtra
 Lulu Ice Skating Rink, Kochi, Kerala

Closed
 Doon Ice Skating Rink, Raipur, Uttarakhand

Outdoor
 Shimla Ice Skating Rink, Shimla, Himachal Pradesh
 Ice Rink, Gulmarg, Jammu and Kashmir
 Ice Rink, Leh, Ladakh
 Ice Rink, Kargil, Ladakh
 Ice Rink, Kaza, Himachal Pradesh

References

Ice skating in India
National governing bodies for ice skating
Sports governing bodies in India
2002 establishments in Delhi
Sports organizations established in 2002